Cap de la Hague is a cape at the tip of the Cotentin peninsula in Normandy, France.

The La Hague area has precambrian granite and gneiss cliffs, several coves and small fields surrounded by hedges. France's oldest rocks are to be found on its coast in Jobourg. Other rocky outcroppings on the coast include Cadomian granite in Auderville and Variscan granite in Flamanville.

The dialect of the Norman language spoken by a minority in the region is called Haguais. The Norman poet Côtis-Capel was a native of the region and used the landscape as inspiration for his poetry. The painter Jean-François Millet was also a native of the region.

The La Hague site, the largest light water reactor nuclear waste reprocessing plant on earth (over half of the world's capacity), is located in the region.

References

External links
Lahague-tourisme.com: Official La Hague tourism website
Festival International de Musique de la Hague website

Headlands of France
Geography of Manche
Landforms of Normandy
Geology of France
Normandy region articles needing translation from French Wikipedia